Citeras Station (CTR) is a class III railway station located in Mekarsari, Rangkasbitung, Lebak Regency. The station, which is located at an altitude of +48 meters, is included in the Jakarta Operational Area I and only serves the KRL Commuterline route. Although it is named Citeras, this station is not located in Citeras Village, but is located to the east of the village itself.

Before KCJ extended the Green Line to Rangkasbitung, this station only served crossing and overtaking between trains for some time. In order to improve commuter rail services in the Lebak Regency area, PT KAI Commuter Jabodetabek then extended the KRL Commuterline route to Rangkasbitung Station. The old Citeras Station underwent a series of renovations to support the operation of the KRL Commuterline. Eventualy, the KRL can run to Rangkasbitung starting 1 April 2017.

Building and layout 
Initially, this station only had two railway lines with line 2 as a straight line. To welcome the operation of the double track segment of Maja–Rangkasbitung, the number of railway lines at this station has been increased to three with the existing track 1 being made a straight track towards Rangkasbitung, while line 2 being made a straight track towards Tanah Abang. The station building has also been updated with a more modern and minimalist architecture. Because the construction of this new station took up the land where the old Staatsspoorwegen station building was located, the old station building was torn down. The platform at this station has also been extended to accommodate a long cars (12 cars).

Services
The following is a list of train services at the Citeras Station.
KRL Commuterline
 Green Line, towards  and

References

External links

Lebak Regency
Railway stations in Banten
Railway stations opened in 1899